The Papua New Guinea Red Cross Society, also known as PNGRCS, was founded in 1977 and has its headquarters in Port Moresby, Papua New Guinea.

References

External links
Official website

Red Cross and Red Crescent national societies
1977 establishments in Papua New Guinea
Medical and health organisations based in Papua New Guinea
Organizations established in 1977